The Bank of Ghana ( BoG) is the central bank of Ghana. It is located in Accra and was formed in 1957. The bank is active in developing financial inclusion policy and is a member of the Alliance for Financial Inclusion.

History

The Central Bank of Ghana traces its roots to the Bank of the Gold Coast (BGC) or Ghana Commercial Bank, where it was nurtured. As soon as local politicians and economists saw political independence in sight in the mid-1950s the agitation for a central bank was revived. It was argued that a central bank was one institution which would give true meaning to political independence. It may be recalled that way back in 1947 some leading politicians had called for the establishment of a national bank with central bank functions to act as banker to government and to cater for the indigenous sector of the economy.

Proposals of the advocates for a central bank were accepted and in early 1955 another select committee was set up by the government to take a new look at the Trevor Report and prepare the grounds for the establishment of a central bank in Ghana. The BGC had already set the stage for central banking: all that was needed was specially trained personnel in central banking and suitable accommodation for the bank to take off.

By the end of 1956, all was set for the establishment of the Bank of Ghana. A new and modern five-storey building had been put up on the High Street, adjacent to the Accra Metropolitan Assembly (AMA) to house both the Bank of Ghana and the Ghana Commercial Bank (GCB).

In March 2012 the Bank of Ghana announced it would be making specific commitments to financial inclusion under the Maya Declaration.

List of governors 
List of governors of the bank since its inception:

 Alfred Eggleston 1 Aug 1957 – 03 Apr 1959
 Hubert Kessels 21 Aug 1959 – 08 Sep 1962
 W.M.Q. Halm 5 Oct 1962 – 13 Aug 1965
 A. Adomako 10 Sep 1965 – 09 Feb 1968
 J.H. Frimpong-Ansah 8 Mar 1968 – 28 Feb 1973
 Amon Nikoi 16 Mar 1973 – June 1977
 A.E.K. Ashiabor 15 Jul 1977–08 Mar 1983
 J. S. Addo 29 Mar 1983 – 3 Jun 1987
 G.K. Agama 15 Jul 1988 – 16 Jul 1997
 Kwabena Duffuor 17 Jul 1997 – 30 Sept 2001
 Paul A. Acquah 1 Oct 2001 – 30 Sept 2009
 K. B. Amissah-Arthur 1 Oct 2009 – 6 Aug 2012
 Henry Kofi Wampah 6 Aug 2012 – 31 March 2016
 Abdul Nashiru Issahaku 1 Apr 2016 – 31 March 2017
 Ernest Addison 1 Apr 2017 –

Corporate profile
The first governor of the bank was Mr. Alfred Eggleston, the former managing director of BGC and an accomplished Scottish banker on secondment to Ghana from the Imperial Bank of India. His deputy governor was one Mr. Douglas F. Stone, another renowned British central banker also on secondment from Bank of England.

The general administration of the bank was entrusted in the hands of a seven-member board of directors under the chairmanship of the governor.

The first board was as follows:
Alfred Eggleston, chairman
 Douglas F. Stone, deputy governor
 R. S. Blay, director
 N. T. Clerk, director
 C. E. Osei, director
 R. C. Parkin, director

The governor of the bank and his deputy were appointed by the governor of the Gold Coast on the recommendation of the prime minister, in accordance with Section 10 (1) of the 1957 Ordinance. The governor and his deputy were each appointed for a term of five years and were eligible for reappointment. Those two officials were answerable to the board for their acts and decisions in the course of general administration of the affairs of the bank. The board itself was also answerable to the Ministry of Finance for efficient management of the bank. The other directors of the board were also appointed by the Prime Minister with the approval of the governor of the Gold Coast for a term of three years, subject to renewal.

Departments 
In 1957, the bank commenced business with six main departments namely:
 The governors' office
 The administration/personnel department
 The banking department
 The issue department
 Accounts/audit department
 Economics/statistics department

The governors' office was headed by the secretary to the board, while the other departments were headed by managers who reported directly to the deputy governor or, in special cases to the governor. The departments were run by the managers in accordance with policies and decisions arrived at by an in-house management accordance with policies arrived at by an in-house management committee comprising the governor, the deputy governor and three or four heads of department appointed by the governor.

With that initial organisational arrangements, the Bank of Ghana assumed its central role in the banking system of Ghana, which then comprised the central bank, two expatriate commercial banks – the British Bank of West Africa (BBWA) (now Standard Chartered Bank) and Barclays Bank Limited (Dominion, Colonial and Overseas); and the new Ghana Commercial Bank (GCB).

There was also the Post Office Savings Bank (POSB), which was, in fact, not a bank by definition; it was only an institution set up by the government to mobilize public savings through the agency of the numerous post offices in the country, for investment in government paper.

Relations with the other banks in the system were set out under sections 
39 – 42 of the 1957 Ordinance. Initially, the relation were not very strong. The Central Bank was to act as banker to other banks and co-operate with them to promote and maintain adequate and reasonable banking services for the public. It was also to ensure high standards of conduct and management in the banking system. The bank was also given powers to require the banks to maintain a proportion of their assets in specified form and to submit monthly returns on their operation to the Central Bank. However, banking supervision or bank examination was not specifically highlighted in the Ordinance.

Awards and honours 
In October 2020, the Bank of Ghana was adjudged the best central bank at the seventh Central Banking Awards.

See also

Savings and Loans Company
Cedi, the currency of Ghana
Central banks and currencies of Africa
Economy of Ghana
List of financial institutions in Ghana

References

External links
Bank of Ghana official site

 
1957 establishments in Ghana
Ghana
 
Buildings and structures in Accra
Banks established in 1957